Terrell on the Law of Patents is a United Kingdom patent law treatise of the twentieth century.

See also
 Sir William Aldous

References

United Kingdom patent law
Works about patent law